Pablo Agustín Palacio (born 18 May 2000) is an Argentine professional footballer who plays as a midfielder for Independiente Rivadavia on loan from Unión de Santa Fe.

Career
Palacio's career began with local club Centros de Actividades Infantiles, which preceded a move to Independiente Rivadavia. He made his professional bow on 9 February 2019 versus Chacarita Juniors, with the midfielder appearing for sixty-four minutes of a Primera B Nacional away win.

On 21 August 2020, Palacio moved to Unión de Santa Fe on loan for 18-months for a fee around 950 thousand pesos, with a purchase option of 150 thousand dollars for 50% of his pass. However, he wasn't able to convince the club and didn't manage to play a single game for Unión, why he returned to Independiente Rivadavia ahead of the 2021 season. After a few games in the 2021 season for Rivadavia, Unión decided to bet on him anyway, why they bought the player free from Rivadavia for a fee of around 4 million pesos on 28 April 2021. However, he would continue to play for Rivadavia on loan for the 2021 season. At the end of the year, the loan deal was extended for one further year.

Career statistics
.

References

External links

2000 births
Living people
Place of birth missing (living people)
Argentine footballers
Association football midfielders
Primera Nacional players
Independiente Rivadavia footballers
Unión de Santa Fe footballers